Mausami is a given name. Notable people with the name include:

Mausami Gurung, Nepalese singer and songwriter
Mausami Patal, fictional character